Sky Store is a service operated by Sky Group in the United Kingdom, Ireland, Germany, Austria and Switzerland that offers movies and TV shows via video streaming or DVD and Blu-ray Disc by mail. It originally launched in 2012 by Sky UK offering over 1,000 movies pay-per-view to Sky Anytime+ customers, and the "Buy & Keep" model launched in 2014. Sky Store is independent from Sky's satellite TV service, meaning that a Sky TV subscription is not required.

The service offers the latest blockbuster movies, TV shows, as well as classic movies for renting (starting from 99p) or buying to keep (from £7.99), digitally in HD quality and optionally a physical version by post. The Sky Store service comes preloaded on Sky Q and Sky+HD boxes, and is also available as a downloadable app on PCs, Now TV, Roku, Android, and other devices.

Sky Store was launched in Germany and Austria in 2017, and Switzerland in 2018.

References

External links

Sky Group
Video rental services
Video on demand services